In representative democracies, a mandate is the authority granted by a constituency to act as its representative. Elections, especially ones with a large margin of victory, are often said to give the newly elected government or elected official an implicit mandate to put into effect certain policies. When a government seeks re-election they may introduce new policies as part of the campaign and are hoping for approval from the voters, and say they are seeking a "new mandate". Governments and elected officials may use language of a "mandate" to lend legitimacy to actions that they take in office.

In some languages, a "mandate" can mean a legislative seat won in an election rather than the electoral victory itself. In case such a mandate is bound to the wishes of the electorate, it is an imperative mandate, otherwise it is called "free".

See also 

 Consent of the governed
 Election promise
 Government platform
 Legitimacy
 Party platform
 Referendum
 Social contract

References

Footnotes

Bibliography 

 
 "Doctrine of Mandate". A dictionary of political phrases and allusions: with a short bibliography By Hugh Montgomery, Philip George Cambray.

Further reading 

 

Democracy
Elections
Political philosophy